The Memphis Southmen, also known as the Memphis Grizzlies, were an American football team based in Memphis, Tennessee. They played in the World Football League (WFL), which operated in 1974 and 1975. They played their home games at Liberty Bowl Memorial Stadium.

From North to South
The team was originally slated to be based in Toronto, Canada, with the nickname of the Northmen. However, when Canadian Prime Minister Pierre Trudeau announced that no U.S.-based professional football league would be allowed in Canada in competition with the Canadian Football League under the Canadian Football Act, a change in venue and nickname was announced. From the beginning, Memphians disliked "Southmen" and the team was informally known as the Memphis Grizzlies. The name appeared to come from the logo, a representation of a bear backed by the sun.

The "Grizzlies" were owned by John F. Bassett. A multi-millionaire, Bassett gave the league instant credibility by signing three stars from the National Football League's Miami Dolphins for the 1975 season: running backs Larry Csonka and Jim Kiick, and wide receiver Paul Warfield. The Grizzlies quarterback was Danny White, who later became the starting quarterback with the Dallas Cowboys from 1976 to 1988. John McVay was introduced as the head coach of the Grizzlies before the 1974 season. After his tenure with the Grizzlies, McVay would later serve as Vice-President and General Manager of the San Francisco 49ers for nineteen years, from 1980 to 1999. During this period, McVay presided over five Super Bowl-winning seasons and was named NFL Executive of the Year in 1989.

The Southmen's home opener against the Detroit Wheels drew 30,122 fans, including Elvis Presley, a professed football fanatic. Country superstar Charlie Rich sang the national anthem. After Rich took his seat next to Elvis afterward, Presley commented, "That's a tough song to sing, ain't it?" Rich replied, "It ain't no Behind Closed Doors."

Even before the Miami Trio arrived, the 1974 Southmen found two durable running backs in J. J. Jennings and John Harvey, and they finished with the league's best record at 17–3. They lost in the semi-finals to the Orlando-based Florida Blazers, 18–15.

In 1975, Larry Csonka, Jim Kiick, and Paul Warfield finally came to Memphis (now officially dubbed the Grizzlies), but even they couldn't save the league, which folded during the middle of its second season. The 1975 Grizzlies finished 7–4; in their last WFL game, they were shut out by the Birmingham Vulcans, 21–0.

Memphis eventually not only received another professional sports team via a relocation from Canada, but one that was officially called the Grizzlies – the Vancouver Grizzlies of the National Basketball Association would move to Memphis in 2001. The NBA Grizzlies are the only major professional sports team to keep its nickname after moving from Canada to the United States.

In 2004 Mississippi's Johnny Wofford produced a DVD honouring the 1974–75 Southmen/Grizzlies. It included pictures from the 2004 30-year reunion conference.

Memphis and the NFL
The Southmen were one of the stronger and better-supported WFL franchises. With the wealth of Bassett, by far the richest owner in the WFL, behind them, the Southmen would have almost certainly been a viable venture had the WFL's overall management been more financially sound.  After the WFL folded, Bassett applied for membership in the NFL as an expansion team. Over 40,000 deposits for season tickets were collected in this effort, which included a December 1975 telethon dubbed the "NFL-a-Thon" on Memphis television station WMC-TV Channel 5. To their dismay, the NFL refused to accept the team. McVay and many of the Southmen moved on to join the New York Giants, where in what has been described as "the closest approximation to a meeting between the champions of the WFL and the NFL", the Southmen reinforcements helped the Giants defeat the defending Super Bowl champion Pittsburgh Steelers 17–0 in a 1976 preseason matchup.

Still, there were fans who would not quit. A lawsuit, Mid-South Grizzlies v. NFL, tried to force the league to accept the Grizzlies. It was not settled until 1984, by which time Bassett owned the Tampa Bay Bandits of the United States Football League and the case was rendered moot.

Long after Presley's death in 1977, his estate was involved in an attempt to bring the NFL to Memphis; the Memphis Hound Dogs proposal ultimately lost (professional football would eventually come to the city in 1995 in the form of the Canadian Football League's Mad Dogs, which Presley's estate had no involvement with; the team folded after that single season).

The NFL's Tennessee Oilers (newly relocated from Houston) played their 1997 season in Memphis before making their permanent home in Nashville.

Schedule and results

1974 regular season

Playoffs

1975 regular season

See also
 1974 World Football League season
 1975 World Football League season

External links
 Memphis Southmen on FunWhileItLasted.net

References

"Head coach", Football Digest August 1974 issue

 
Defunct American football teams
American football teams in Toronto
American football teams in Tennessee
1974 establishments in Tennessee
1975 disestablishments in Tennessee
American football teams established in 1974
Sports clubs disestablished in 1975